The Junior Tag League is an annual professional wrestling tag team tournament held by the All Japan Pro Wrestling (AJPW) promotion. In 2013, the tournament was rebranded , following in the footsteps of the Junior League, which had been renamed "Junior Hyper League" the previous year. In 2014, the tournament was again rebranded after the singles Junior League, now taking the name .

The tournament is contested in a single block round-robin format with all teams facing each other once. All matches have a thirty-minute time limit and in case of a time limit draw, both teams are awarded one point, while a win earns a team two points. In case of a draw through a double countout, the match is declared a no contest with neither team being awarded a point. After all teams have faced each other, the top two teams move onto the finals to determine the winner of the tournament. Rankings in the tournament are not determined by head-to-head matches and in the event of more than two teams finishing clear of the other teams, extra matches will be held to determine the finalists. Usually, the winners of the tournament earn themselves a shot at All Japan's secondary tag team championship, the All Asia Tag Team Championship, if not already the reigning champions.

Hikaru Sato holds the record for most Junior Tag League wins with five. Sato and Atsushi Aoki are the only team to have won the tournament more than once, having won it in 2014, 2015 and 2016.

List of winners
1984: Gran Hamada and Mighty Inoue
2002: Jimmy Yang and Kaz Hayashi
2006: Mazada and Nosawa Rongai
2008: Katsuhiko Nakajima and Ryuji Hijikata
2009: Minoru and Toshizo
2010: Bushi and Super Crazy
2011: Kai and Kaz Hayashi
2012: Kaz Hayashi and Shuji Kondo
2013: Atsushi Aoki and Kotaro Suzuki
2014: Atsushi Aoki and Hikaru Sato
2015: Atsushi Aoki and Hikaru Sato
2016: Atsushi Aoki and Hikaru Sato
2017: Atsushi Maruyama and Masashi Takeda
2018: Koji Iwamoto and Tajiri
2019: Hikaru Sato and Yusuke Okada
2020: Evolution (Dan Tamura and Hikaru Sato)
2021: Total Eclipse (Yusuke Kodama and Hokuto Omori)

1984
In 1984, All Japan Pro Wrestling held the "International Junior Heavyweight Tag Team League" between August 30 and September 12.

2002
In 2002, All Japan Pro Wrestling held the first "World's Strongest Junior Tag League", a junior heavyweight version of the World's Strongest Tag Determination League. The tournament took place over eleven shows between September 8 and 22. The day after winning the tournament, Jimmy Yang and Kaz Hayashi went on to unsuccessfully challenge Arashi and Nobutaka Araya for the All Asia Tag Team Championship.

2006
After a four-year break, All Japan Pro Wrestling held its first Junior Tag League over nine shows between February 25 and March 10, 2006.

2008
After no Junior Tag League took place in 2007, the tournament returned in early 2008, held over seven shows between March 12 and 23.

2009
The 2009 Junior Tag League took place over eight shows between April 17 and 29.

2010
The 2010 Junior Tag League took place over seven shows between April 18 and May 2.

2011
The 2011 Junior Tag League took place over eight shows between April 17 and 30.

2012
The 2012 Junior Tag League took place over six shows between April 1 and 14. The winners of the tournament, Kaz Hayashi and Shuji Kondo, went on to unsuccessfully challenge Daisuke Sekimoto and Yuji Okabayashi for the All Asia Tag Team Championship on May 27.

2013
In 2013, All Japan Pro Wrestling renamed the Junior Tag League the "Junior Hyper Tag League", following in the footsteps of the singles Junior League, which had been renamed "Junior Hyper League" the previous summer. The tournament was held over six shows between March 30 and April 7, 2013. The winners of the tournament, Atsushi Aoki and Kotaro Suzuki, went on to defeat Koji Kanemoto and Minoru Tanaka for the All Asia Tag Team Championship on April 25.

2014
In 2014, All Japan Pro Wrestling again renamed the tournament the "Jr. Tag Battle of Glory", following in the footsteps of the singles Junior League, which had been renamed "Jr. Battle of Glory" the previous February. The tournament was held over eight shows between October 8 and 22, 2014. The winners of the tournament earned a spot in the 2014 World's Strongest Tag Determination League.

2015
The 2015 Jr. Tag Battle of Glory took place over eight shows between October 12 and 23. Último Dragón and Yoshinobu Kanemaru entered the tournament as the reigning All Asia Tag Team Champions, but relinquished the title after losing to Isami Kodaka and Yuko Miyamoto in their opening match.

2016
The 2016 Jr. Tag Battle of Glory took place over five shows between November 12 and 17.

2017
The 2017 Jr. Tag Battle of Glory took place over five shows between November 3 and 9.

2018
The 2018 Junior Tag League took place over ten shows between August 3 and 25.

2019
The 2019 Junior Tag League took place over eight shows between July 17 and 28. Atsushi Aoki was announced to team with Hikaru Sato, while Yusuke Okada was supposed to team with Akira Francesco. After Aoki was killed in a motorcycle accident on June 3, Okada eventually requested to replace him as Sato's partner which was later granted while Hokuto Omori replaced Okada as Francesco's partner.

2020
The 2020 Jr. Tag Battle of Glory took place on December 27, in a self produced show by Hikaru Sato.

2021
The 2021 Jr. Tag Battle of Glory was a one-day tournament and took place on December 26.

See also
AJPW Junior League
Nippon TV Cup Jr. Heavyweight Tag League
Super Junior Tag Tournament

Notes

References

External links
All-Japan.co.jp 

All Japan Pro Wrestling tournaments
Tag team tournaments